The Vuelta al Ecuador  is a cycling race held annually in Ecuador. It was part of the UCI America Tour in category 2.2 from 2007 to 2010.

Winners

References

Cycle races in Ecuador
UCI America Tour races
Recurring sporting events established in 1966